Hameed Hussain Sheikh Ismail, MBE (19 May 1901 – 3 August 1974) was a Sri Lankan lawyer and politician. He was the 5th Speaker of the Parliament of Sri Lanka.

Early life and education
Born in Puttalam to a middle-class family, started his Qur’anic lessons in 1905. He was educated at St. Andrew's College, Puttalam and at Wesley College, Colombo. He entered the Ceylon Law College, and passed the Proctor's Finals exams in 1925 winning several prizes.

Legal career
Having qualified as a Proctor, Ismail started his legal practice in Colombo, but soon moved it to his home town of Puttalam.

Political career
Entering local politics, Ismail was elected member of the Puttalam Local Board in 1929 and member of the Puttalam Urban Council in 1933 and served as Chairmen of the Puttalam Urban Council from 1936 to 1947. He was elected un-contested in the 1947 general election from the Puttalam electorate as an independent candidate to the Parliament of Ceylon. Soon after he was appointed by Prime Minister D. S. Senanayake as Parliamentary Secretary to the Minister of Food and Co-operative Undertakings. In 1948, he was elected Vice President of the All Ceylon Muslim League. Elected in the 1952 general election, he was elected Deputy Speaker and the Deputy Chairman of Committees serving till 1956 and was elected Speaker following the 1956 general election, serving till 1959. In 1961, he was elected President of the All Ceylon Muslim League. He was appointed Member of the Order of the British Empire (MBE) in the 1949 New Year Honours.

References

External links
Hameed Hussain Sheikh Ismail
Speaker of the Parliament

1901 births
1974 deaths
Speakers of the Parliament of Sri Lanka
Deputy speakers and chairmen of committees of the Parliament of Sri Lanka
Deputy chairmen of committees of the Parliament of Sri Lanka
Parliamentary secretaries of Ceylon
Ceylonese Members of the Order of the British Empire
Ceylonese proctors
Alumni of Wesley College, Colombo
Alumni of Ceylon Law College